Benkestok may refer to:

Persons and families
 Benkestok (noble family)
 Jon Trondson Benkestok
 Torleiv Trondson Benkestok
 Trond Torleivsson Benkestok